Dehnow-e Shams Ali (also Romanized as Dehnow-e Shams ʿAlī; also known as Dehnow-e Shamsalī) is a village in Rig Rural District, in the Central District of Lordegan County, Chaharmahal and Bakhtiari Province, Iran. At the 2006 census, its population was 130, in 24 families.

References 

Populated places in Lordegan County